Yannick Alléno (born 16 December 1968) is a French chef who operates the restaurants Pavillon Ledoyen and L'Abysse in Paris and Le 1947 in Courchevel. He has been awarded twelve Michelin stars in his career.

Biography

He began his career at the Royal Monceau working with Gabriel Biscay before joining the Hotel Sofitel Sèvres and working closely with chefs Roland Durand and Martial Henguehardm. After entering Drouant and studying under Chef Louis Grondard, he started the Scribe kitchens.

In 2003, the Hotel Le Meurice appointed Alléno chef de cuisine, where he stayed for 10 years. In 2008 he founded the restaurant Le 1947 at Cheval Blanc Courchevel, and in July 2014 he took over the kitchens of Pavillon Ledoyen on the Champs-Elysées in Paris.

In 2008, with Florence Cane, he launched Le Groupe Yannick Alléno, with clients in Saint-Tropez and Paris, at the Royal Mansour in Marrakech, at the One&Only The Palm in Dubai, at the Shangri-La in Beijing and in the 101 tower in Taipei. He also launched the magazine Yam, and published in 2014 "Sauces Réflexion d'un cuisinier" in which he described new methods of flavor extraction for sauces.

Alléno has received three Michelin stars for Pavillon Ledoyen, one for Le 1947, one for Stay in Seoul, and one for L'Abysse.

In 2015, former staff of Pavillon Ledoyen, along with the CGT trade union, filed a suit in labour relations court accusing Alléno and second-in-command Sébastien Lefort of harassment and violent behavior including kicking one employee in the thigh. Alléno, Lefort and Cane denied the allegations.

Restaurants
Pavillon Ledoyen – Carré des Champs-Élysées, 8th arrondissement of Paris – France:
 Alléno Paris: 3 stars Michelin Guide since 2015
 L'Abysse: sushi bar. 2 stars
  Beaupassage – 7th arrondissement of Paris – France:
 Allénothèque: contemporary restaurant and wine cellar
 Hôtel Le Cheval Blanc – Courchevel – France:
 1947: 3 stars Michelin Guide since 2017
 Le Triptyque: contemporary restaurant
 Royal Mansour – Marrakesh: 
 Gastronomic Restaurant La Grande Table Française
 Gastronomic Restaurant La Grande Table Marocaine
 Restaurant La Table: French cuisine
 One&Only The Palm – Dubai: 
 STAY by Yannick Alléno. 2 stars
 ZEST
 1O1: Mediterranean contemporary restaurant
 Signiel Seoul – Lotte World Tower 79F – Korea:
 STAY, Modern Restaurant by Yannick Alléno
 The Lounge of SIGNIEL, casual all-day dining restaurant
 SIGNIEL Seoul’s Pastry Salon, deli shop and dessert
 Restaurant FRE en Monforte d'Alba (1 étoile par la Guide Michelin ) avec le CEO de REVA RESORT Daniele Scaglia
 Hôtel Hermitage Monte-Carlo: 
 Yannick Alléno à l’Hôtel Hermitage Monte-Carlo, Michelin 1-star

Bibliography 
 2006: Quatre saisons à la table N5, Yannick Alléno et Kazuko Masui, Éditions Glénat
 2009: 1.01 billionéations, Yannick Alléno co-écrit par Kazuko Masui, Éditions Glénat – Prix spécial du jury 2010 Pierre-Christian Taittinger – Antonin Carême
 2009: Le carnet des tapas des montagnes, Yannick Alléno, Éditions Glénat
 2010: Terroir Parisien, Yannick Alléno, photos de Jean-François Mallet, Éditions Laymon – Prix La Mazille Beau Livre
 2013: "Ma Cuisine Française" by Yannick Alléno. The most emblematic book for a whole generation – 1200 pages – 1500 €
 2014: Best in the world – Beijing Cookbook fair – May 2014
 2014: "Sauces, reflections of a chef" by Yannick Alléno

References

Chefs from Paris
1968 births
Living people
People from Puteaux
Knights of the Ordre national du Mérite
Chevaliers of the Légion d'honneur
Head chefs of Michelin starred restaurants
Knights of the Order of Agricultural Merit